HFB may refer to:

 Hafnium boride (HfB)
 Hamburger Flugzeugbau, German aircraft manufacturer
 Harry F. Byrd, a prominent US Senator from Virginia
 Hexafluorobenzene, an aromatic organofluoride
 Hexafluoro-2-butyne, an alkyne organofluoride 
 Hindu Forum of Britain
 Hochschule für Bankwirtschaft (HfB), now part of the Frankfurt School of Finance & Management
 Housing Finance Bank, Uganda
 Houston Food Bank